The 2021 F4 Chinese Championship (Shell Helix FIA F4 Chinese Championship) was the seventh season of the F4 Chinese Championship. It began on 22 October at Zhuhai International Circuit and ended on 5 December at Ningbo International Circuit.

Teams and drivers

Race calendar and results 
The calendar featuring 4 rounds and 14 races was announced on 31 March. The date of the second round at Wuhan Street Circuit and double points for races at Guia Circuit were confirmed on 24 May. On 27 May, all the outdoor sports, including motorsports, were suspended in China until further notice in order to revise safety protocols in the aftermath of Gansu ultramarathon disaster. On the same day, the opening round at Zhuhai International Circuit was postponed. The revised calendar was communicated to the teams on 30 August. The rounds at Wuhan Street Circuit and Ningbo International Circuit were cancelled while Zhuhai International Circuit was set to host two rounds. The planned opening round was once again postponed one week afterwards and later moved to Ningbo to its original date. The round in Ningbo was once again postponed, this time 3–5 December, making it the season's finale.

Championship standings

Drivers' Championship

Teams' Cup

Notes

References

External links 
  

F4 Chinese Championship seasons
Formula 4
Chinese F4
Chinese F4